The U.S. Post Office, located at 380 Hamilton Ave., is the main post office in Palo Alto, California. The U.S. Post Office was added to the National Register of Historic Places on April 5, 1981.

History 
The post office was constructed from 1932 to 1933 and was designed by Palo Alto architect Birge Clark; during the Great Depression, the Post Office department hired local architects to design post offices rather than designing them in Washington. The building was designed in the Mediterranean Revival style and features a tile hip roof in varying shades of red, an open arcade with round arches in the front, and round arched entryways at both ends of the arcade. The entries have bronze frames and decorative bronze transoms; the doors were originally bronze as well but were replaced with lighter metals. While the Mediterranean Revival style was at the time an unusual choice for a post office, it was widely used in Palo Alto and at Stanford University; the post office is one of the few that reflect regional architecture.

See also 
List of United States post offices
National Register of Historic Places listings in Santa Clara County, California

References

External links 

Palo Alto
Mediterranean Revival architecture in California
Government buildings completed in 1933
Buildings and structures in Palo Alto, California
National Register of Historic Places in Santa Clara County, California